The 1906 Davidson Wildcats football team represented Davidson University in the 1906 college football season. According to Fuzzy Woodruff, the team threw the first forward pass in the South.

Schedule

Game summaries

North Carolina
In the first game of the season, Davidson and the Tar Heels fought to a scoreless tie in Charlotte.

Georgia
In 1906, the Davidson football team made history. Prior to a game against Georgia, the Davidson coaching staff took note of the new rule that made a forward pass a legal play. During the game, the team completed several short passes over the middle and ended up winning 15–0. Fuzzy Woodruff gives the team credit for being the first team in the South to complete a forward pass in his book, "The History of Southern Football."

The starting lineup was Sadler (left end), Walker (left tackle), Sentz (left guard), Edgerton (center), Spicer (right guard), Allen (right tackle), Huntington (right end), Elliott (quarterback), Miller (left halfback), Denny (right halfback), McKay (fullback).

Georgia Tech
Lob Brown was responsible for the win over Davidson by a field goal.

Clemson
Davidson gave Clemson its third scoreless tie of the season.

VPI
VPI beat Davidson 10–0, all the scoring done in the first half.

The starting lineup was: Sadler (left end); Walker (left tackle); Lentz (left guard); Egerton (center); Whittaker (right guard); Spicer (right tackle); Huntington (right end); Elliott (quarterback); Denny (left halfback); Miller (right halfback); McCoy (fullback)

References

 

Davidson
Davidson Wildcats football seasons
Davidson football